Alexis Ruano Delgado (born 4 August 1985), known simply as Alexis, is a Spanish former professional footballer. Mainly a central defender, he could also operate as a full-back.

He amassed La Liga totals of 321 matches and 17 goals over 15 seasons, representing in the competition Málaga, Getafe (two spells), Valencia, Sevilla and Alavés. He also competed professionally in Turkey and Saudi Arabia.

Club career

Málaga and Getafe
Born in Málaga, Alexis joined Getafe CF from Málaga CF for 2006–07, for €2.5 million; he had spent three years at the Andalusia club, alternating between the first team and the second. He would first appear for the main squad of the latter on 15 February 2004, playing eight minutes in a 5–2 home win over RCD Espanyol.

Alexis scored the winning goal for Getafe against Real Madrid, in a 1–0 home victory on 14 October 2006. He was part of the league's best defence that season (only 33 goals in 38 games).

Valencia
In April 2007, Valencia signed Alexis to a €6.5 million deal at the Mestalla Stadium that ran until 2013, beating off competition from Real Madrid. After spending most of the campaign sidelined with a severe knee injury, he helped the team win the Copa del Rey, netting the second goal in a 3–1 victory over former club Getafe in the final after Juan Mata had scored the first.

Alexis, who started the season as Raúl Albiol centre-back partner, netted in a 2–2 draw at UD Almería on 14 September 2008, but also spent two months in the sidelines due to a pubalgia ailment. He played 24 matches the following campaign, helping the Che to a third place in La Liga and former side Málaga avoid relegation as he headed home in the last-minute of the home fixture against CD Tenerife, which dropped down a level instead with that 0–1 loss.

Sevilla and Getafe return
On 24 August 2010, Alexis joined Sevilla FC for €5 million, signing a six-year contract as a replacement for Arsenal-bound Sébastien Squillaci. He made 21 league appearances in his first year (26 overall) as the team finished fifth and qualified for the UEFA Europa League.

In the third game of 2011–12 – his first – Alexis salvaged a point for Sevilla with an 86th-minute header away against Villarreal CF (2–2); he would only be fourth of fifth-choice stopper for new manager Marcelino García Toral, however. In late February 2012, even though the winter transfer window had already closed, he was allowed to join former club Getafe on loan until the end of the season, as the Madrid outskirts side was immerse in a deep injury crisis to their defensive sector. The move was extended for the entire 2012–13.

Alexis agreed to a permanent four-year deal in the summer of 2013. He continued to be an undisputed starter when healthy, but missed several games due to suspension.

Beşiktaş
On 21 January 2016, aged 30, Alexis moved abroad for the first time, joining Beşiktaş J.K. in the Turkish Süper Lig for €2 million. After a 3–3 away draw against Akhisar Belediyespor on 23 April, his poor performance led to criticism and accusations of match fixing.

Alavés
Alexis returned to Spain and its top tier on 29 July 2016, signing for newly promoted club Deportivo Alavés. He scored twice from 24 appearances in his first season, in an eventual ninth-place finish.

Later years
Alexis moved abroad again on 22 June 2018, joining Al-Ahli in the Saudi Professional League on a two-year contract. He returned to his country on 7 August 2019, however, agreeing to a two-year deal at newly promoted second division side Racing de Santander.

Honours
Getafe
Copa del Rey runner-up: 2006–07

Valencia
Copa del Rey: 2007–08

Beşiktaş
Süper Lig: 2015–16

Alavés
Copa del Rey runner-up: 2016–17

Spain
UEFA European Under-19 Championship: 2004
FIFA U-20 World Cup runner-up: 2003

Individual
La Liga Breakthrough Player: 2006–07

References

External links

1985 births
Living people
Spanish footballers
Footballers from Málaga
Association football defenders
La Liga players
Segunda División players
Segunda División B players
Atlético Malagueño players
Málaga CF players
Getafe CF footballers
Valencia CF players
Sevilla FC players
Deportivo Alavés players
Racing de Santander players
Süper Lig players
Beşiktaş J.K. footballers
Saudi Professional League players
Al-Ahli Saudi FC players
Spain youth international footballers
Spain under-21 international footballers
Spanish expatriate footballers
Expatriate footballers in Turkey
Expatriate footballers in Saudi Arabia
Spanish expatriate sportspeople in Turkey
Spanish expatriate sportspeople in Saudi Arabia